Waiters' Race is a race that tests the speed that a waiter can carry a loaded tray without tipping it.

Origin of the waiters race
It is possible to find archive footage showing a very old waiters race in Paris, London and Berlin at the beginning of the 20th century. Actually, the origin of the waiters race (the "course des garçons de café"), comes from France.

At their beginning, waiters races started to be organized in order to improve the recognition of the waiter profession in Paris. This is the reason why even today the event has a French Touch and organizers used to schedule races on Bastille Day for instance.

A real international event 
Today, it is possible to find waiters races in more than 53 countries all over the world. From Hong Kong to Washington DC, from Brussels to Jerusalem or from Buenos Aires to Japan, waiters are at honor for a day and make a show in front of thousands of spectators. In 2011, "the course des garcons de cafe" come back in Paris after years. Up-to-date, more than 724 waiters races in the world from the beginning have been listed by the International Waiters Race Community Website WaitersRace. And races are found every day.

Winners of Waiters Races
Winners of waiters races usually receive prizes, but that is not all. Many of them suggest that this victory changed their career. This was the case, for instance, for Bassel Halawani who won the Jerusalem Waiters Race and became manager in his Hotel few days after (watch the interview of Bassel.

References

External links

 WaitersRace.com, the International and Officiel Waiters Races Website 
 National Waiters' Day Website in UK (https://nationalwaitersday.com/)
 Video from archive showing old waiters race in Paris 
 Link to a documentary on French Television about Waiters Race5 Course des Garçons des Café 
 Old Photo of Waiters Race 
 Courses des garçons de café in New Orleans 

Racing
Novelty running